The Honneurs de la Cour (Honors of the Court) were ceremonious presentations to the sovereign at the Royal Court of France that were formal for women but more casual for men. It was an honour granted only to the families of ancient nobility. It allowed them to approach the King and the Queen of France.

Overview
The Honors of the Court "were the most prestigious noble honour of the 18th century, meant to honour the most ancient and representing noble families".

Formally such presentations were only granted to noble families able to prove a lineage dating back to 1400 A.D. without tracks of ennoblement. However, the king could grant exemptions to families that had been dedicated to serve him. He could also refuse a valid candidate with sufficient nobility whose family was not involved enough in the king's wars as nobles were primarily mounted warriors who had sworn allegiance to their sovereign and promised to fight for him. On a list of candidates he would then place a remark next to the name of the refused applicant saying "ne se peut" (can't be) or "attendre" (wait).

The Honors of the Court should not be mistaken for court life. The oldest nobility did not always match the court nobility. Many families living at court were descendants from less ancient nobility while many nobles of antique nobility did not stay at court. Moreover, life at the Versailles Court was expensive and many were unable to afford it.

The nobleman who was granted the presentation would follow a royal hunt on board of one of the king's carriages. At that point he would be casually introduced to the king. A noblewoman's presentation was much more formal, taking place during a specific ceremony.

From 1715 to 1790, 942 families were granted the Honors of the Court; 880 of them were French. François Bluche, who studied the royal genealogical archives, said that among the 942 families "462 were able to prove a noble lineage dating back to 1400, if excluding sovereign houses and foreign nobles who, unlike one can think, made up more than half of the French nobleman received at Court". He has limited his work to a list of 43 Houses especially flattered by the King's archive, these 43 families are considered of major regional or national importance and members of the highest 18th century nobility. 

According to Régis Valette only 280 of the 880 French families who were granted the Honors of the Court still remain today.

List of families who were granted the Honneurs de la Cour 

The following table provides an incomplete list of families who were granted the Honors of the Court, including dates (when available) and sources. The ones listed by François Bluche, considered the most prominent French noble families of the 18th century, are marked with bold script.

Notes and references

See also 
 Court of Versailles
 Etiquette

External links 
 History of the Notice honneurs de la Cour (French)

Etiquette
Ancien Régime
French royal court